The Grueby Faience Company, founded in 1894, was an American ceramics company that produced distinctive American art pottery vases and tiles during America's Arts and Crafts Movement.

The company was founded in Revere, Massachusetts, by William Henry Grueby (Boston, 1867—New York, 1925), who had been inspired by the matte glazes on French pottery and the refined simplicity of Japanese ceramics he had seen at the World's Columbian Exposition in Chicago the previous year; and the architect-designer William Graves. During its first years, the company produced glazed architectural terra cotta and faience tiles. The company initially focused on simple art pottery vases designed by George Prentiss Kendrick. Beginning in 1897 and 1898, Grueby introduced matte glazes, including the matte cucumber green that became the company's hallmark.

Grueby's work won two gold medals and one silver medal at the 1900 Exposition Universelle in Paris; medals at the 1901 Pan-American Exposition in Buffalo, New York; and a gold medal at both the 1901 St. Petersburg Exhibition of Ceramics and the 1904 Louisiana Purchase Exposition in St. Louis.

Grueby Faience stood in the mainstream of Arts and Crafts and Art Nouveau design in the United States. Graves and Kendrick were eventually replaced by the architect Addison LeBoutillier and Henry Belknap, who had worked with Louis Comfort Tiffany. Later, Karl Langenbeck, formerly of the Rookwood Pottery, would superintend design. Soon Grueby vases were for sale at Samuel Bing's shop in Paris, L'Art Nouveau, which gave a name to the progressive art movement, and through Tiffany & Co. in New York, where Tiffany Studios used Grueby lamp bases.  Gustav Stickley incorporated Grueby tiles in his stands and tables, shared a stand with Grueby at the Pan-American Exposition, and through his catalog offered Grueby vases and lamps.

Grueby's work incited mass-market competition and the company went bankrupt in 1909. Grueby emerged from bankruptcy and began limited production runs that included statues, pottery, and tiles until 1911. There was a fire in the manufactory in 1913, but Grueby rebuilt. In 1917, the C. Pardee Works in Perth Amboy, New Jersey, bought out the company's works; the Grueby company closed for good in 1920.

Grueby Faience Company, which still remains better known for its art pottery, also produced glazed architectural tiles, which were impressed in molds. Grueby polychrome glazed tiles can still be seen in the revetments of Interborough Rapid Transit Company subway stations in New York and making up the thirty-six original tile murals in the main lobby of Scranton, Pennsylvania's Lackawanna Train Station (restored in 2007-09).

The standard monograph is Susan J. Montgomery, The Ceramics of William H. Grueby: The Spirit of New Idea in Artistic Handicraft, 1993. The collection at Dartmouth College is catalogued by Montgomery, Grueby Pottery: A New England Arts and Crafts Venture : The William Curry Collection, Hood Museum of Art, Dartmouth College, 1994.

References

External links

Grueby Pottery Examples
Alice in Wonderland tiles by the Grueby Faience Company at Cleveland Public Library
Grueby Faience and Pottery, an art dealer's site
Arts and Crafts movement
American art pottery
Art Nouveau